Colors is the second compilation album by Japanese singer and songwriter Rina Aiuchi. It was released on 24 March 2010 by Giza Studio. The concept album features the color as its theme, including 17 previously-released B-side and album tracks with the colors in their titles. Colors reached number forty-eight on the Oricon albums chart in and has sold over 4,503 copies.

Track listing

Charts

Certification and sales

|-
! scope="row"| Japan (RIAJ)
| 
| 4,503 
|-
|}

Release history

References 

2010 compilation albums
Being Inc. compilation albums
Giza Studio albums
Japanese-language compilation albums